Toddalioideae is a formerly recognized subfamily of the family Rutaceae. Its type genus, Toddalia, is now accepted as a synonym of Zanthoxylum and placed in the subfamily Zanthoxyloideae.

References

Historically recognized angiosperm taxa